Rafael Nadal defeated Juan Martín del Potro in the final, 4–6, 6–3, 6–4 to win the men's singles tennis title at the 2013 Indian Wells Masters. It was Nadal's third Indian Wells singles title, his record 22nd ATP Tour Masters 1000 title, and his 53rd title overall.

Roger Federer was the defending champion, but lost to Nadal in the quarterfinals.

Seeds
All seeds receive a bye into the second round.

Draw

Finals

Top half

Section 1

Section 2

Section 3

Section 4

Bottom half

Section 5

Section 6

Section 7

Section 8

Qualifying

Seeds

Qualifiers

Qualifying draw

First qualifier

Second qualifier

Third qualifier

Fourth qualifier

Fifth qualifier

Sixth qualifier

Seventh qualifier

Eighth qualifier

Ninth qualifier

Tenth qualifier

Eleventh qualifier

Twelfth qualifier

References

Main Draw
Qualifying Draw

BNP Paribas Open - Singles
2013 BNP Paribas Open